Gaziantep Kamil Ocak Stadium was a multi-purpose stadium in Gaziantep, Turkey. It was used mostly for football matches and was the home ground of Gaziantepspor until 2017. The stadium hold 16,981 people. It was named after the Turkish politician Mehmet Kamil Ocak.

References

External links
Venue information
The Stadium Guide – Kamil Ocak Stadium

1974 establishments in Turkey
Football venues in Turkey
Gaziantepspor
Multi-purpose stadiums in Turkey
Sports venues completed in 1974
Süper Lig venues